The Crime Bible is a fictional religious book that has appeared in various comic book series published by DC Comics. The book and the religious groups that have formed around it exist within DC's main shared universe, known as the DC Universe.

The book deals with the exploits of Cain and his works of evil in the world, in association with Lilith. The copy of the Bible seen most often in the DCU allegedly has a cover of stone, made from the physical rock used to kill Abel.

Publication history
The Crime Bible first appeared in the 2006 to 2007 series 52, in the sections dealing with the characters Renee Montoya and Batwoman. The story was continued in the later part of 2007 in Crime Bible: Five Lessons of Blood, a five-issue limited series featuring Montoya in her new guise as the Question. Since then it has reappeared as the inspiration for the villains facing Batwoman in Detective Comics, in which it appears that a rift has developed between the followers of the Crime Bible based on differing interpretations of its teachings. The focus of the rift is that the book supposedly predicts the actual death of Batwoman; when she survives being stabbed through the heart many of the cultists come to believe the book is deeply flawed.

Bruno Mannheim even uses the Crime Bible to help in running Intergang.

Final Crisis

In 2008, the Crime Bible was featured once again in the series Final Crisis. There the character Libra appears to be using the Crime Bible to organize the DC Universe's supervillains along religious lines. The Religion of Crime uses the Crime Bible as their central text.

Collections
The limited series was collected into one volume:
 The Question: Five Books of Blood (128 pages, hardcover, June 2008)

In other media

Video games
 The Crime Bible is featured in DC Universe Online. In the hero campaign, Question sends the players to claim the Crime Bible from Bruno Mannheim. In the villain campaign, Deathstroke and Calculator send the players to infiltrate Intergang and steal the Crime Bible from Bruno Mannheim.

References

External links
 Crime Bible at the DC Database Project
 Into the Crime Bible With Greg Rucka, Newsarama, August 31, 2007
 Geoff Johns Talks to Greg Rucka About The Crime Bible: The Five Books of Blood, Newsarama, October 31, 2007
 

2006 comics debuts
Mythology in DC Comics